Universitetet (Swedish: "the university") is a railway station in Stockholm along the Roslagsbanan, named for nearby Stockholm University. The present station was inaugurated on 7 January 2010, replacing the older station by the same name which had been closed for service since 14 June 2009. The closest station to the north, Frescati, was also closed at this time, and will not open again.

The former station Universitetet was originally called Experimentalfältet, but was renamed in the 1960s when the university campus was moved to its present site.

Not far from the station is the Universitetet metro station and several bus lines.

References

Stockholm University
Railway stations in Stockholm
Railway stations opened in 2010
Railway stations at university and college campuses